Zelimkhan Dzhabrailovich Bakayev (born 1 July 1996) is a Russian footballer who plays as a midfielder for FC Zenit Saint Petersburg and the Russia national team.

Club career
He made his debut in the Russian Professional Football League for FC Spartak-2 Moscow on 26 April 2014 in a game against FC Metallurg Vyksa.

He made his debut for the main squad of FC Spartak Moscow on 23 September 2015 in a Russian Cup game against FC Volga Nizhny Novgorod. He made his Russian Premier League debut for Spartak on 23 July 2017 as a starter in a game against FC Ufa.

On 1 August 2018, he joined FC Arsenal Tula on loan for the 2018–19 season.

Upon his return from loan, he scored his first two goals for Spartak on 8 August 2019 in an away Europa League qualifier against FC Thun. 3 days later, he scored his first two Russian Premier League goals for Spartak in a 3–1 victory over FC Akhmat Grozny. 

Bakayev left Spartak as a free agent on 1 June 2022.

On 15 June 2022, Bakayev signed a contract with FC Zenit Saint Petersburg for three years with an option for the fourth year.

International
He was first called up to Russia national football team for UEFA Euro 2020 qualifying matches against San Marino and Cyprus in June 2019. He made his debut on 13 October 2019 in a Euro 2020 qualifier against Cyprus. He substituted Aleksei Ionov in the 78th minute and participated in one of the three goals Russia scored in the remaining time.

He scored his first international goal on 7 September 2021 in a World Cup qualifier against Malta, establishing the final score of 2–0 at home from the penalty spot.

Honors

Club
Spartak Moscow
Russian Cup: 2021–22
Russian Super Cup: 2017

Zenit St. Petersburg
Russian Super Cup: 2022

Career statistics

Club

International goals

Scores and results list Russia's goal tally first.

Personal life
His younger brother Soltmurad Bakayev is also a footballer. Bakayev is an ethnic Ingush.

References

External links
 
 

1996 births
People from Nazran
Living people
Russian footballers
Russian people of Ingush descent
Association football midfielders
FC Spartak-2 Moscow players
FC Spartak Moscow players
FC Arsenal Tula players
FC Zenit Saint Petersburg players
Russia under-21 international footballers
Russia international footballers
Russian Premier League players
Russian First League players
Russian Second League players